Antonio Esposito (born 18 November 1994) is an Italian judoka.

He is the bronze medallist of the 2018 European Judo Championships in the -81 kg category.

References

External links
 

1994 births
Living people
Italian male judoka
Competitors at the 2018 Mediterranean Games
European Games competitors for Italy
Judoka at the 2019 European Games
20th-century Italian people
21st-century Italian people